Kozmino is an oil port  southeast of Vladivostok on the Nakhodka Bay near Nakhodka, Primorsky Krai, Russia and close to Russia's borders with China and North Korea, on the coast of the Sea of Japan.

Kozmino is the terminal point of the Eastern Siberia – Pacific Ocean pipeline (since end of 2012). With the opening of its terminal on December 28, 2009, the port of Kozmino instantly became Russia's third-most important oil outlet.

References

Oil terminals